"I Don't Have the Heart" is a song written by Allan Rich and  and recorded by American R&B recording artist James Ingram. It is Ingram's only number-one single as a solo artist on the US Billboard Hot 100, and his second number-one single overall, since the Patti Austin-featured "Baby, Come to Me", which topped the Hot 100 in 1983. Ingram received a Grammy Award nomination for Best Male Pop Vocal Performance at the 33rd Grammy Awards in 1991 for the song.

Released as the fourth single from Ingram's 1989 album It's Real, "I Don't Have the Heart" reached the top of the Billboard Hot 100 chart on October 20, 1990. The ballad remained at No. 1 for one week, and became his final Top 40 hit.  Singer Stacy Lattisaw recorded the song as well, and her version was released on Motown Records at the same time as Ingram's, although it was not as commercially successful.

Personnel
Keyboards, Synth Programming: Jud Friedman
Bass Guitar, String Conductor: Thom Bell
Electric Guitar: Paul Jackson Jr.
Drums: Ricky Lawson
Background Vocals: The Aquarian Singers

Charts

Weekly charts

Year-end charts

References

1989 songs
1990 singles
Billboard Hot 100 number-one singles
Cashbox number-one singles
James Ingram songs
Stacy Lattisaw songs
Motown singles
Warner Records singles
Songs written by Jud Friedman
Pop ballads